"Love on the Line" is a song by ten piece hip-hop group Blazin' Squad, released as the second single from their debut studio album, In the Beginning.

Background
"Love on the Line" was one of the first songs recorded for the group's debut album. It was written by Christian Ballard, Andrew Murray, and Russ Ballard, and produced by Danish production duo Cutfather & Joe. The main version of the song features samples from the hit single "Freak Me" by Another Level. The song was released as the album's second single on 11 November 2002. It was not as successful as the group's debut single "Crossroads", however, still managed to peak at #6 on the UK Singles Chart.

Music video
The music video for "Love on the Line" premiered in September 2002. The video lasts for a total length of three minutes and fifty-two seconds. The video follows a very similar format to the video for the preceding single "Crossroads". The video depicts the band performing the song in and around a London council estate, and on an abandoned industrial estate. It also depicts scenes of a girl who members of the band are attempting to chat up.

Track listing
 Digital single
 "Love on the Line" – 3:45
 "Bounce" – 4:55

 UK CD #1
 "Love on the Line" – 3:45
 "Bounce" – 4:55
 "Love on the Line" (CD-Rom Video) – 3:45

UK CD #2
 "Love on the Line" – 3:45
 "Price to Pay" – 4:03
 "In Your Eyes" – 3:43

Cassette
 "Love on the Line" – 3:45
 "Bounce" – 4:55

Personnel
Songwriting – Christian Ballard, Andrew Murray, Russ Ballard
Production – Cutfather & Joe
Mixing – Mads Nilsson, Cutfather & Joe
Recording and programming – Joe Belmaati
Additional backing vocals – Kristian Lund
Keyboards – Joe Belmaati, Andrew Murray
Percussion – Mich Hedin Hansen
Additional percussion – Christian Ballard

Source:

Charts

References

2002 singles
Blazin' Squad songs
Songs written by Russ Ballard
Contemporary R&B ballads
Songs written by Christian Ballard (songwriter)
2002 songs
East West Records singles
Songs about telephone calls